Norman Stanley Rathbone (8 September 1914 – 13 July 1995) was an Anglican priest in the second half of the 20th century.

He was educated at Rugby and Christ's College, Cambridge  and ordained in 1939. He was Curate then Vicar of St Mary Magdalen, Coventry and after that a Canon Residentiary at Lincoln Cathedral. In 1969 he became Dean of Hereford, a post he held until his retirement in 1981.

He is buried in Dore Abbey churchyard.

Notes

1914 births
1995 deaths
People educated at Rugby School
Alumni of Christ's College, Cambridge
Church of England deans
Deans of Hereford